Chtouka Aït Baha is a province in the Moroccan economic region of Souss-Massa. Its population in 2004 was 297,245. 

The major cities and towns are: 
 Ait Baha
 Biougra
 Massa

Subdivisions
The province is divided administratively into the following:

References
 Chtouka Ait Baha pictures

 
Chtouka Aït Baha Province